James Roche (11 June 1909 – 23 April 1980) was an Irish hurler who played as a left wing-forward for the Limerick senior team.

Roche joined the team during the 1933 championship and was a regular member of the starting fifteen until his retirement almost a decade later. During that time he won three All-Ireland medals, five Munster medals and five National Hurling League medals. Roche was an All-Ireland runner-up on two occasions.

At club level Roche played with Croom.

References

Croom hurlers
Limerick inter-county hurlers
All-Ireland Senior Hurling Championship winners
Jim